The W.R.C. Hall is an historic building located in Iowa Falls, Iowa, United States. Built in 1898, the building has segmented arched windows and a bracketed metal cornice, which are features of the Italianate style.

W.R.C. stands for the Woman's Relief Corps, which was created to serve the needs of American Civil War veterans, widows and orphans. The local group was organized as the Payne Post #48 in 1886. They organized such events as Easter programs, entertainment, oyster suppers, flower sales, and they cared for veteran's graves. As their numbers declined the W.R.C. deeded the building to the American Legion, who eventually deeded it to the city of Iowa Falls. They sold it to a local person and it has been used as a commercial building.

The building was individually listed on the National Register of Historic Places in 1993. It was included as a contributing property in the Washington Avenue Commercial Historic District in 2012.

References

Cultural infrastructure completed in 1898
Victorian architecture in Iowa
Iowa Falls, Iowa
Buildings and structures in Hardin County, Iowa
Clubhouses on the National Register of Historic Places in Iowa
National Register of Historic Places in Hardin County, Iowa
Individually listed contributing properties to historic districts on the National Register in Iowa
Woman's Relief Corps
Grand Army of the Republic buildings and structures